Savage is the debut album by American singer-songwriter Moxiie. The album was released on December 19, 2012, under the independent label RattleBrain Production LLC. The album was distributed for Digital Download.

Background 
The album was recording during the 2012. In this album Moxiie worked with producer like Fredro who produced songs for Sugababes, Shontelle, Wonder Girls, Sinéad O'Connor, Christina Milian who also is the owner of the RattleBrain Productions LLC, label who distributed the album, REO who produced "Hello" by Beyoncé for her album I Am... Sasha Fierce, Peter Wade who worked with Jennifer Lopez and many more. All the lyrics were written by Moxiie. The artwork of the album were designed by Great Eclectic.

Critical reception

Buzzworthy.mtv.com said "Moxiie returned at the tail end of 2012 with her newest release, Savage – a collection of feisty, in-your-face pop anthems. "Lay Down Your Crown," the final offering from the set, sees Moxiie coming for wigs... and crowns."
OhMyRock.com said "Savage is pop that reminds us of a more commercial Charli XCX meets Natalia Kills."
JonAlisBlog.com said about Moxiie's debut album "(...) Aggressive pop jam with heavy synths, infectious hard hitting claps and sickening melody."
TheProphetBlog.net said "Like a more top-forty-friendly Santigold, Moxiie's mixed twisted tribal beats, big fat bass, and gory synths to create the Jungle Pop sound. To put it simply: Jungle Pop is about as fresh as pop music gets."

Track listing

Personnel
 Moxiie – vocal, lyricist, producer, background vocals
 Fredro – producer, mixer, composer, arranger
 REO – producer, mixer, composer, arranger
 Steff Reed – producer, mixer, composer, arranger
 The SupaSonics – producers, composers, arrangers
 Charley Hustle – producer, composer, lyricist, mixer, arranger
 Cannon – lyricist, background vocals
 Chi Salaam – producer, composer, mixer, arranger
 Kris Kasanova – lyricist, vocal, featured artist
 Nerve of The SupaSonic – lyricist
 GC Castillo – guitarist
 Great Eclectic – artwork

References

Pop albums by American artists
2012 debut albums